The Alexander Marsh House is an historic house located in Worcester, Massachusetts.

Description and history 
The -story Greek Revival cottage was built in 1848 by Levi Lincoln, Jr., and is a well-preserved and relatively unaltered instance of what was then a widely popular form. The house has a typical side hall plan, with an entry framed by sidelight windows, with full-length windows to the entry's right. The front-facing gable end is fully pedimented, and the porch is supported by fluted Doric columns. The house's first occupant was Alexander Marsh, a piano dealer.

The house was listed on the National Register of Historic Places on March 5, 1980.

See also
National Register of Historic Places listings in northwestern Worcester, Massachusetts
National Register of Historic Places listings in Worcester County, Massachusetts

References

Houses completed in 1848
Houses in Worcester, Massachusetts
National Register of Historic Places in Worcester, Massachusetts
Houses on the National Register of Historic Places in Worcester County, Massachusetts
Greek Revival houses in Massachusetts